Acraea circeis, the white acraea, is a butterfly in the family Nymphalidae. It is found in Sierra Leone, Liberia, Ivory Coast, Ghana, Nigeria, Cameroon, Bioko, the Republic of the Congo, northern Angola and the south-western part of the Democratic Republic of the Congo.

Description
 
A. circeis Drury is very similar to the type-form of the preceding [ A. parrhasia servona ] Godart, 1819  , merely differing in having the forewing black-scaled only at the margins and on the veins, otherwise almost transparent, while the light yellow median band of the hindwing is of uniform breadth with the distal boundary almost straight. Sierra Leone to North Angola.

Biology
The habitat consists of forests.

The larvae feed on Urera oblongifolia.

Taxonomy
It is a member of the Acraea circeis species group- but see also Pierre & Bernaud, 2014

References

External links

Acraea circeis Le Site des Acraea de Dominique Bernaud
Images representing Acraea circeis at Bold

Butterflies described in 1782
circeis